{{DISPLAYTITLE:Tommy february6 discography}}

The discography of Japanese pop singer Tomoko Kawase's alter-ego pseudonym "Tommy february6" consists of four studio albums, one compilation album and 9 singles, released through Defstar Records between 2003 and 2009, and later Warner from 2011 onwards.

Many of her albums and singles are released in February, including her debut album Tommy february6 (2001), "Magic in Your Eyes" (2004), Strawberry Cream Soda Pop Daydream (2009), February & Heavenly (2012) and "Be My Valentine" (2013).

Studio albums

Extended play

Compilation albums

Singles

Promotional singles

Music videos

Guest appearances

Other appearances

Notes

References

Discographies of Japanese artists
Pop music discographies